Coatomer subunit alpha is a protein that in humans is encoded by the COPA gene.

Function 

In eukaryotic cells, protein transport between the endoplasmic reticulum and Golgi compartments is mediated in part by non-clathrin-coated vesicular coat proteins (COPs). Seven coat proteins have been identified, and they represent subunits of a complex known as coatomer. The subunits are designated alpha-COP, beta-COP, beta-prime-COP, gamma-COP, delta-COP, epsilon-COP, and zeta-COP. The alpha-COP, encoded by COPA, shares high sequence similarity with RET1, the homologous alpha subunit of the coatomer complex in yeast. Also, the N-terminal 25 amino acids of alpha-COP encode the bioactive peptide, xenin, which stimulates exocrine pancreatic secretion and may act as a gastrointestinal hormone. Alternative splicing results in multiple splice forms encoding distinct isoforms.

Interactions 

COPA (gene) has been shown to interact with COPE and COPB1.

References

External links

Further reading